Giovanni Sbrissa (born 25 September 1996) is an Italian professional footballer who plays as a midfielder.

Club career

Vicenza
Born in Castelfranco Veneto, Veneto region, Sbrissa started his career at Venetian club Vicenza. On 17 July 2013, he received a call-up from the first team for a pre-season camp. He made his debut on 4 August, against FeralpiSalò in 2013–14 Coppa Italia. Sbrissa played 11 times for Vicenza in 2013–14 Lega Pro Prima Divisione. He extended his contract to 30 June 2016 on 4 March 2014.

In 2014–15 season Vicenza was admitted to 2014–15 Serie B, which Sbrissa played 32 times in the league, as No.20. He also played once in Italian Cup.

On 8 June 2015, Sbrissa signed a new three-year contract. However, less than a month later he was sold.

Sassuolo
On 30 June 2015, Sbrissa was signed by Sassuolo for €840,000, in a five-year contract; Thomas Manfredini was signed by Vicenza in a definitive deal in exchange on a free transfer. Sbrissa also immediately returned to Vicenza for 2015–16 Serie B, on a temporary deal.

Vicenza (loan)
Sbrissa returned to Vicenza from Sassuolo, effective on 1 July 2015. He changed to wear No.11 shirt, which previous owners Leonardo Spinazzola and Srđan Spiridonović had returned to Juventus and changed to wear No.20 shirt respectively.

Brescia (loan)
On 31 August 2016, Sbrissa was signed by Brescia on a temporary deal from Sassuolo. He was part of Sassuolo's 2016 pre-season campaign.

On 21 June 2017, Brescia excised the option to buy the player. However, Sassuolo also excised the counter-option on the next day.

Cesena (loan)
On 12 July 2017, Sbrissa was signed by Cesena on a temporary basis, with an option to buy him outright from Sassuolo.

Siena (loan)
On 31 July 2018, Sbrissa joined to Siena on loan until 30 June 2019.

Pergolettese
On 2 September 2019, he signed with Pergolettese.

International career
Sbrissa played four times for Italy national under-19 football team in 2014–15 season, all friendlies. He missed the elite round of the qualification due to injury. Sbrissa was replaced by Andrea Palazzi instead.

References

External links
 

Italian footballers
L.R. Vicenza players
U.S. Sassuolo Calcio players
A.C. Cesena players
A.C.N. Siena 1904 players
U.S. Pergolettese 1932 players
S.S.D. Lucchese 1905 players
Serie B players
Serie C players
Italy youth international footballers
Association football midfielders
People from Castelfranco Veneto
Footballers from Veneto
1996 births
Living people
Universiade medalists in football
Universiade bronze medalists for Italy
Medalists at the 2019 Summer Universiade
Sportspeople from the Province of Treviso